NK NAŠK is a Croatian football club based in the town of Našice in Slavonia. Club is founded in Našice in 1919.  From 1995 until 1997, NAŠK was playing in Croatian Second Football League.  From 1997, NAŠK is playing again in Croatian Third Football League.

Association football clubs established in 1919
Football clubs in Croatia
Football clubs in Osijek-Baranja County
1919 establishments in Croatia
Našice